The 1975 Pittsburgh Steelers season was the franchise's 43rd in the National Football League (NFL). The Steelers were defending champions for the first time in their forty-year history and repeated as league champions. The team was led by a dominating defense and a quick offense, and won Super Bowl X over the Dallas Cowboys, 21–17. The 1975 Steelers had one of the greatest defensive teams of all time. The team posted their best defensive numbers since 1946, and scored more points than any other Steelers team, later surpassed by two points in 2010.

In 2007, the 1975 Steelers were ranked as the seventh greatest Super Bowl champions on the NFL Network's documentary series America's Game: The Super Bowl Champions, with team commentary from Lynn Swann, Dwight White, and Mike Wagner, and narrated by Bruce Willis. More than a decade later, the team ranked #10 on the 100 greatest teams of all time presented by the NFL on its 100th anniversary. The 1975 Steelers' +211 point differential stands as the best in franchise history. They won by at least 21 points six times, with their season superlative 37–0 shutout at San Diego in the opener on September 21.

Offseason

NFL Draft 

|}

Personnel

Staff

Roster

Preseason 
During the preseason, the Steelers acquired undrafted free-agent, John Banaszak. The Defensive tackle from Eastern Michigan played in three games and later became the 1975 Team ROY (Rookie of the Year).

Schedule

Regular season

Schedule

Game summaries

Week 1

 
 
 
 
 
 
 

In the Week 1 game, the Steelers opened the season as defending champions, and crushed the Chargers, 37-0, in San Diego. (1-0)

Week 2 

 
 
 
 
 
 
 
 

In Week 2, the Steelers, coming off a crushing defeat of the Chargers in Week 1, came to play revenge eager Buffalo in Pittsburgh. The Bills had been beaten the previous year by the Steelers in the playoffs, 32-14. Chuck Noll had warned the team the previous week that the team did not play very well, however, the players ignored him and were beaten by a 227-yard-rushing day by RB O.J. Simpson, 30-21. (1-1)

Week 3 

 
 
 
 
 
 
 

In this Week 3 matchup, the Steelers would be hosted by the Cleveland Browns. These two teams had already been established as one of the league's best rivalries by this time, and Joe Greene's infamous kicking of the Browns lineman Bob McKay only fueled the rivalry. The fight that broke out afterwards caught it on fire. Greene was later fined $500 while the Steelers beat the Browns, 42-6. (2-1) This was the first of eleven consecutive victories for the Steelers.

Week 4 

 
 
 
 
 
 
 

In Week 4, the Steelers beat the Denver Broncos in Three Rivers, 20-9. (3-1)

Week 5 

    
    
    
    
    
    
    

In Week 5, the Steelers crushed Chicago, 34-3. Three weeks after the Steelers were beaten by Buffalo, the team was 4-1, and had allowed only 18 points during the last three weeks while scoring 99. (4-1)

Week 6 

    
    
    
    
    
    

In Week 5, the Packers would host the Steelers in Milwaukee, however, the tense battle ended in Pittsburgh's favor, 16-13. (5-1)

Week 7 

    
    
    
    
    
    
    
    
    

In Week 7, the Steelers played the Bengals in Riverfront Stadium and beat up the Bengals, 30–24. (6–1)

Week 8 

    
    
    
    
    
    
    

In this heated Week 8 battle, the Steelers would play host to the Houston Oilers. Pittsburgh sealed the win with a 4th quarter touchdown pass from #12 Terry Bradshaw to #82 John Stallworth that placed them at the top of the division. (7-1)

Week 9 

    
    
    
    
    

In Week 9, the Steelers beat the Chiefs, 28-3. (8-1)

Week 10 

    
    
    
    
    
    
    
    

In Week 10, the Steelers defeated the Oilers again, this time in Houston 32-9, and secured a playoff spot. (9-1)

Week 11 

    
    
    
    
    

In Week 11, the Steelers beat the Jets 20-7. (10-1)

Week 12 

    
    
    
    
    
    
    
    

In another defeat of Cleveland in Week 13, 31-17, the Steelers continued their winning streak to 10. (11-1)

Week 13 

    
    
    
    
    
    
    

In Week 13, the Steelers finished the sweep of the division by beating the Bengals again, 35-14. (12-1)

Week 14 

    
    
    

In the meaningless Week 14 game, the Steelers were beaten by Los Angeles, 10-3. (12-2)

Standings

Stats

Quarter-by-quarter

Postseason

Schedule

Game summaries

Divisional 

    
    
    
    
    
    

 Franco Harris gained 152 yds rushing, one yard less than the Baltimore Colts offense. Andy Russell set a record for longest playoff fumble return.

AFC Championship 

    
    
    
    
    

Pittsburgh won the game, despite giving up eight turnovers.

Super Bowl

    
    
    
    
    
    
    
    

 Lynn Swann earned the MVP award catching 4 receptions for 161 yards.
 The Pittsburgh Steelers won their 2nd of their 6 Super Bowl championships.

Awards, honors, and records
 Mel Blount, National Football League Defensive Player of the Year Award
 Lynn Swann, Super Bowl Most Valuable Player

References

External links
 1975 Pittsburgh Steelers season at Profootballreference.com 
 1975 Pittsburgh Steelers season statistics at jt-sw.com 

Pittsburgh Steelers seasons
American Football Conference championship seasons
Super Bowl champion seasons
Pittsburgh Steelers
AFC Central championship seasons
Pittsburgh Steel